William Dennis Pottery Kiln and House Site is a historic archaeological site located at Randleman, Randolph County, North Carolina. It was the site of the pottery kiln and home of William Dennis (b. 1769) and his son Thomas (b. 1791) and remained in operation until 1832. The pottery produced simple, utilitarian redware, and a variety of decorative slipware and tableware products. The William Dennis pottery and house site was located in 1974.

It was listed on the National Register of Historic Places in 2014.

References 

"The Quaker Ceramic Tradition in the NC Piedmont: Documentation and Preliminary Survey of the Dennis Family Pottery", The Southern Friend: Journal of the Friends Historical Society, (1988)

Archaeological sites on the National Register of Historic Places in North Carolina
Buildings and structures in Randolph County, North Carolina
National Register of Historic Places in Randolph County, North Carolina